Okwagbe is a commercial town in the Ughelli South Local Government Area of Delta State, Nigeria. The town is located along the Forçados River, and shares boundaries with the Oginibo, Okuemor, Otegbo, Owahwa, Egbo-Ide, and Okreka (Ofonibaya) communities, among others. Okwagbe is the most populated town in Ughelli South, and is regarded as a center of commerce. The market feature gives rise to the town's name, which means "coming together."

Okwagbe has two government primary schools, one government secondary school, one missionary secondary school, a government health center, private clinics, two major market, one police station, a military outlet/check point, and ten quarters, also known as streets.

The community is sub-divided into two wards: Okwagbe Inland and Okwagbe Water-side.

References

Populated places in Delta State